Nguyễn Huy Tưởng (làng Dục Tú, Từ Sơn, Bắc Ninh, 6 May 1912 – 25 July 1960) was a Vietnamese revolutionary, writer and playwright. He joined the independence movement at a young age and held positions in the cultural apparatus of the North Vietnam state. In 1996 he was posthumously awarded the Hồ Chí Minh Prize for Literature and Art.

Works

Novels 
 (1942)
An Tư công chúa (1944)
Truyện Anh Lục (1955)
Bốn năm sau (1959)
Sống mãi với Thủ Đô (1961)
Lá cờ thêu sáu chữ vàng

Plays 
:vi:Vũ Như Tô (1943)
:vi:Cột đồng Mã Viện (1944)
Bắc Sơn (1946)
Những người ở lại (1948)
Anh Sơ đầu quân (tập kịch, 1949)
Lũy hoa (1960)

References

External link

Vietnamese writers
Vietnamese dramatists and playwrights
1912 births
1960 deaths
20th-century dramatists and playwrights